Tacita is a genus of sea snails, marine gastropod mollusks in the family Buccinidae, the true whelks.

Species
Species within the genus Tacita include:

 Tacita abyssorum 
 Tacita danielsseni

References

Buccinidae